Esther Ambah Numaba Cobbah is a  communication specialist from Ghana. In 2022 she won the Woman of the Year award at the Ghana Outstanding Women Awards event. She is the founder of Strategic Communications Africa Limited (Stratcomm Africa) and a board member of the International Public Relations Association (IPRA). She authored the book Dare to Be.

Early life and education 
Cobbah was born in Secondi, in the Western Region of Ghana. She attended primary school in Komenda in the central region of Ghana, after her parents settled there. She attended Wesley Girl's High School. Cobbah is a graduate of the University of Ghana, Legon, as well as Cornell University in New York.

Recognition and awards   

 Best communication Entrepreneur of the Year (2011)
 Chartered Institute of Marketing Ghana (CIMG) Marketing Woman of the Year (2012)
 Outstanding Corporate Woman of the Year at the 2013 Ghana Women's Awards
 Institute of Public Relations Ghana, Public Relations Personality of the Year (2013)
 Public Relations Consultancy of the Year 2013 Award (Stratcomm Africa)
 Outstanding woman of the year at GOWA, 2022

Personal life 
She is married to lawyer Tsatsu Tsikata.

References

University of Ghana alumni
Year of birth missing (living people)
Living people